The University of Miami School of Law (Miami Law or UM Law) is the law school of the University of Miami, a private research university in Coral Gables, Florida. 

Founded in 1926, the University of Miami School of Law is the oldest law school in South Florida, graduating its first class of 13 students in 1929. The school offers 300 courses in 18 areas of study, 17 legal clinics and practicums, and over two dozen interdisciplinary and joint-degree programs.

Campus

The University of Miami School of Law is centered on a central courtyard on the University of Miami campus called the Bricks. 

The University of Miami School of Law Library has a collection of over 600,000 volumes in print and microform and subscribes to a large list of electronic resources.

The University of Miami campus is served by the Miami Metrorail at its University station.

Academics
The University of Miami School of Law was founded concurrently with the University of Miami's founding in 1926. Starting in 1952, the school introduced and began offering an  LL.M. degree in taxation. In 1957, it developed and began to offer an LL.M. in Inter-American Law. In 1959, a Master in Comparative Law (now an LL.M.) was introduced. In 1998, the school decided to reduce the size of its entering JD classes by 15 percent.

In addition to its JD and LL.M degrees, University of Miami School of Law also offers several joint-degree programs in international arbitration, maritime law, tax law, business, and other subjects.

The University of Miami School of Law hosts the annual Heckerling Institute on Estate Planning, a conference for estate planning professionals, and its graduate estate planning program is one of the best regarded in the country. The law school also hosts an annual symposium for psychology, public policy, and law.

The school offers extensive public interest programs and opportunities for its students, including with the Center for Ethics and Public Service that offers in-house clinics and educational programs including the Children and Youth Law Clinic, Health and Elder Law Clinic, and Corporate and Professional Responsibility Program. The HOPE Public Interest Resource Center at University of Miami School of Law grants law students an opportunity to become involved in over 25 different projects annually, reaching various underserved and at-risk populations locally, nationally, and abroad.

Curriculum
The University of Miami School of Law has 265 faculty and a student to faculty ratio of 7:1. First-year students take a series of required courses covering the theory and substance of law while exploring political, commercial, and social dimensions of legal institutions. In addition to required courses, first-year students also are permitted to choose one elective in their second semester.

University of Miami School of Law students have the opportunity to combine their J.D. degrees with a variety of concurrent degrees, including an MBA from the University of Miami Patti and Allan Herbert Business School and graduate degrees in communications, music business, public health, or marine affairs. There is also a joint J.D./LL.M. program in which students can complete both degrees in seven semesters in the areas of taxation, international law, international arbitration, ocean and coastal law, and real property development. The law school also offers programs leading to a LL.M. degree in taxation, estate planning, real property, entertainment, arts, and sports law, comparative law, inter-American law, international law, international arbitration, and ocean and coastal law.

Accreditations
The University of Miami School of Law is accredited by the American Bar Association and is a member of the Association of American Law Schools.

Students

Admissions
As of 2018, median LSAT for University of Miami School of Law students is 159 and median undergraduate GPA is 3.53.

Costs
Total cost of attendance (including tuition, fees, and living expenses) at University of Miami School of Law was $74,815 annually as of the 2015-2016 academic year. Law School Transparency's estimated debt-financed cost of attendance for three years is $259,857.

Student demographics
The University of Miami School of Law has a total student body of approximately 1,250. As of Fall 2020, 54% of its students body are female, 48% are minorities, 66% speak more than one language, and 47% enroll in the University of Miami School of Law immediately after graduating from college. Students range in age from 20 to 51 with a median age of 24.

Student activities

Journals and publications
The University of Miami School of Law's flagship student-edited law review is University of Miami Law Review. The School also publishes five additional law school student-edited journals:
 Business Law Review
 Inter-American Law Review
 International & Comparative Law Review
 National Security & Armed Conflict Law Review
 Race and Social Justice Law Review

The School sponsors Jotwell, a peer-reviewed legal blog specializing in short reviews of recent legal scholarly publications.

Moot Court programs
The University of Miami School of Law offers students the opportunity to compete for membership on both the Charles C. Papy Jr. Moot Court Board and the International Moot Court Board. Both boards make up Miami's Moot Court Board, which is ranked 14th in the nation as of 2011. The Charles C. Papy Moot Court Board hosts a Negotiation Competition, Mock Trial Competition, Fall and Spring C. Clyde Atkins Advanced Moot Court Competitions, and the John T. Gaubatz Competition. The board also participates in numerous inter-school competitions across the nation. In 2011, the Charles C. Papy Moot Court Board advanced to the finals of the American Bar Association's Law Student Division National Appellate Advocacy Competition with one team member winning the competition's Best Oralist Award.

International Moot Court program
University of Miami School of Law is the only U.S. law school with an International Moot Court Program (IMCP), which prepares student to compete in several public and private law competitions held around the world. The law school hosts a pre-moot for the Willem C. Vis International Commercial Arbitration Moot each spring that attracts competitors from law schools in Europe, Central America, and South America. In 2010, the University of Miami's School of Law's IMCP won second place overall at the ICC Moot in The Hague and won two of the top three oralist awards. In 2019, the University of Miami School of Law's IMCP placed first in the U.S. and second overall in the Americas round of the ICC competition. The School's International Arbitration LL.M. Program has performed well in several arbitral moots. In 2011, IMCP won first place at the Frankfurt Investment Arbitration Moot Court competition held in Frankfurt, Germany. In the Willem C. Vis International Commercial Arbitration Moot, held in Vienna, Austria, IMCP has taken home multiple awards, including "Honorable Mentions" for Best Oralist from 2006 to 2009 and finished 14th out of 252 schools of law in 2010.

Student Bar Association and Honor Council
The University of Miami's School of Law offers participation in the Student Bar Association, (SBA), which serves as the law school's student government and works closely with the faculty and administration to improve student life on the law school campus. The SBA also acts as a conduit to the American Bar Association and the school's SBA president and its elected ABA representatives serve as delegates to the national SBA convention. The University of Miami School of Law also has a student-run Honor Council, which investigates and adjudicates alleged violations of the Honor Code of the School of Law, which is chaired by the School's Honor Council president.

Study abroad programs
The University of Miami School of Law offers 27 Study Abroad options in 14 countries

Alumni
According to University of Miami School of Law's official American Bar Association-required disclosures in 2017, 75% of the Class of 2017 obtained full-time, long-term, JD-required employment nine months after graduation. University of Miami's Law School Transparency underemployment score is 13.8%, indicating the percentage of the Class of 2017 that was either unemployed, pursuing an additional degree, or working in non-professional, short-term, or part-time jobs nine months after graduating.

The job-placement rate for graduates of the University of Miami School of Law is greater than or equal to the average national job placement rate for the past six years. The American Bar Association reports that within nine months of graduation about 75% of the 260 students in the University of Miami School of Law's Class of 2017 were employed in jobs requiring a Juris Doctor and eighteen students were reported as unemployed. Among the University of Miami School of Law's 2017 graduates, 63 graduates are employed in small law firms consisting of between two and ten attorneys, 49 graduates are employed in business or industry, 27 graduates are employed in large law firms (defined as firms with over 251 full-time attorneys).

The University of Miami School of Law has more than 20,000 alumni practicing law throughout the United States and approximately eighty countries around the world.

Rankings
In 2022, U.S. News & World Report ranked the University of Miami School of Law the 73nd best law school in the nation, down from 72nd best in 2021.

In 2019, the University of Miami School of Law's White & Case International Arbitration LL.M. Program was ranked among the top 10 alternative dispute resolution degrees globally. Its Academic Achievement Program provides participating students additional tools to succeed in law school.

Deans
University of Miami School of Law has had 16 deans since its 1926 founding, including:
 Richmond A. Rasco, 1926 – 1931
 Russell A. Rasco 1935 - 1957
 James A. Burnes, 1957 – 1962
 Wesley Alba Sturges, 1961 – 1962
 M. Minnette Massey, 1962 – 1966
 Frederick D. Lewis, 1966 – 1973
 Thomas A. Thomas, 1973 – 1974
 Soia Mentschikoff, 1974 – 1982
 Claude R. Sowle, 1982 – 1986
 Mary E. Doyle, 1986 – 1994 and interim dean, 1998 – 1999
 Samuel C. Thompson, 1994 – 1998
 Dennis O. Lynch, 1999 – 2008
 Paul R. Verkuil, 2008 – 2009
 Patricia D. White, 2009 – 2019
 Anthony E. Varona, 2019 – 2021
 Nell Jessup Newton, interim dean, 2021–2022
 David Yellen, 2022 -

Notable alumni

Notable present and past faculty
 Alan S. Becker, law professor and legal evidence expert
 A. Jay Cristol, law professor and bankruptcy law expert
 Mary Anne Franks, law professor
 David Ladd, former law professor, former Register of Copyrights 1980-1985   
 Dexter Lehtinen, law professor and former federal attorney
 Soia Mentschikoff, University of Miami School of Law dean (1974 to 1982) and first female law professor at Harvard Law School
 Marilyn Milian, University of Miami School of Law adjunct law professor in litigation, host of The People's Court
 Nell Jessup Newton, University of Miami School of Law interim dean 
 Jan Paulsson, chairman, University of Miami School of Law international arbitration LL.M. program and International Monetary Fund judge
 Marybeth Peters, former visiting law professor of Copyright Law in 1980's, Register of Copyrights 1994-2010   
 Stephen Urice, law professor and cultural property law expert 
 Bruce Winick, law professor and mental health law expert
 Steven Winter, former law professor

References

External links 
 

Educational institutions established in 1926
ABA-accredited law schools in Florida
University of Miami
1926 establishments in Florida